Paper Wings may refer to:

Music
 Paper Wings, a 2005 album by Cauterize, a band that included Chuck Coles
 Paper Wings, a composition by Jake Heggie from The Faces of Love: The Songs of Jake Heggie, 1999
 "Paper Wings", a song by Barclay James Harvest from Everyone Is Everybody Else, 1974
 "Paper Wings", a song by Gillian Welch from Revival, 1996
 "Paper Wings", a song by Little Auk from the film North Sea Texas, 2011
 "Paper Wings", a song by Rise Against from Siren Song of the Counter Culture, 2004
 "Paper Wings", a song by Staind from Staind, 2011

Other uses
 Paper Wings, a 2014 poetry collection by Maureen Duffy
 Paper Wings (Différence d'altitude), a short film by Vincent Toi
 Red Bull Paper Wings, the official paper plane world championship which is held by Red Bull under the rules developed by the Paper Aircraft Association.